Sultan Osman Ali is a Somali ruler and the 9th and current Sultan of the Habr Yunis Sultanate.

See also 
 Somali aristocratic and court titles

References 

Somali sultans
Somalian Muslims
20th-century Somalian people
20th-century monarchs in Africa
1957 births
Living people